Acadiana High School is located in Scott, Louisiana, United States.  Acadiana High School opened in 1969 following the consolidation of Judice High School, located in Judice Community, and Scott High School, located in Scott.

Donald Aguillard, a former assistant principal at Acadiana High, was among those parties who challenged the Louisiana Balanced Treatment Act regarding evolution and creation science, a measure authored by then State Senator Bill P. Keith of Shreveport, and signed into law by Governor David C. Treen. The law was invalidated by the United States Supreme Court in 1987 in the case named for Aguillard, Edwards v. Aguillard. As an original plaintiff, Aguillard became the defendant on appeal.

Athletics
Acadiana High athletics competes in the LHSAA and its nickname is Rams. 

Sports include cross country, baseball, basketball, football, golf, soccer, softball, swimming, tennis, track, volleyball and wrestling.

Championships
Football championships
(6) State Championships: 2006, 2010, 2013, 2014, 2019, 2020

Notable alumni 

 Felecia Angelle, voice actress affiliated with Funimation
 Alley Broussard (Class of 2003) – Running Back, LSU Tigers (2003–2006)
 Jacob Cutrera (Class of 2006) – NFL linebacker, Jacksonville Jaguars (2010–2011) and Tampa Bay Buccaneers (2011–2013)
 Joe Fontenot, Former MLB player (Florida Marlins)
 Cody Mandell (class of 2012)- NFL cowboys punter, (2014-present)
 Gil Meche (Class of 1996) – MLB pitcher, Seattle Mariners (1999–2000, 2003–2006) and Kansas City Royals (2007–2010)
 Luke Montz, Former MLB player (Washington Nationals)
 Kevin Morgan, Former MLB player (New York Mets)
 Kim Perrot (Class of 1986) – WNBA Houston Comets guard, 1997–1998
 Stryker Trahan (Class of 2012) - baseball player Arizona Diamondbacks
 Sheri Sam (Class of 1992)- WNBA (1999-2009) 2 Time WNBA Champion (Seattle Storm 2004; Detroit Shock 2008)

References

External links
http://www.lpssonline.com – Lafayette Parish School System
http://www.lpssonline.com/site45.php – Acadiana High School
https://web.archive.org/web/20180412065724/http://www.acadianaband.net/ -Acadiana Band
https://web.archive.org/web/20131219005534/http://www.sportsnola.com/sports/prep-sports/blogs/acadiana-runs-over-parkway-in-record-setting-class-5a-title-game.html

Public high schools in Louisiana
Education in Lafayette, Louisiana
Schools in Lafayette Parish, Louisiana
1969 establishments in Louisiana